5th Escort Group was a British formation of the Royal Navy which saw action during the Second World War, principally in the Battle of the Atlantic.

Formation
5th Escort Group (5 EG) was formed in March 1941, one of the earliest escort groups to be set up.

Service history
5 EG's first action was a major convoy battle in defence of HX 112 in March 1941. This was due to the loss of three U-boat aces in March, and British Intelligence penetration of the U-boat Arms Enigma code after April. In 5 June EG moved to escort south- and north-bound convoys to and from Gibraltar and the South Atlantic. These too were successful, despite the threat across the Bay of Biscay of both air and U-boat attack. In October 1941 5 EG returned to escort duty in the North Atlantic.

The group underwent several changes, as ships were transferred, or were docked for extended repair. In December 1941 Macintyre was posted to Argentia as liaison officer, and, as all the ships had become worn out, 5 EG was disbanded after nine months service. During this period 5 EG had escorted over two dozen convoys, totalling over 700 ships of which just 12 were lost. No warships were lost from the group, which accounted for two U-boats in its career.

Table: convoys escorted

Notes

References
Clay Blair : Hitler's U-Boat War Vol I (1996). 
Arnold Hague : The Allied Convoy System 1939–1945 (2000).   (Canada);  (UK).
Paul Kemp  : U-Boats Destroyed  ( 1997) . 
Macintyre Donald : U-Boat Killer (1956) ISBN (none)
Axel Neistle : German U-Boat Losses during World War II  (1998). 
Stephen Roskill : The War at Sea 1939–1945   Vol I (1954). ISBN (none)

External links
D MacIntyre at unit-histories
HMS Walker at naval-history

Escort Groups of the Royal Navy in World War II